Italy competed at the 1938 European Athletics Championships in Paris, France, from 3 to 5 September (men) and after in Vienna, Austria from 17 to 18 September (women).

Medalists

Top eight

Men (Paris)

Women (Vienna)

See also
 Italy national athletics team

References

External links
 EAA official site

Italy at the European Athletics Championships
Nations at the 1938 European Athletics Championships
1938 in Italian sport